Events from the year 1998 in the United States.

Incumbents

Federal government 
President: Bill Clinton (D-Arkansas)
Vice President: Al Gore (D-Tennessee)
Chief Justice: William H. Rehnquist (Wisconsin)
Speaker of the House of Representatives: Newt Gingrich (R-Georgia)
Senate Majority Leader: Trent Lott (R-Mississippi)
Congress: 105th

State governments

Events

January

 January 1 – Smoking is banned in all California bars and restaurants.
 January 4–10 – A massive winter storm, partly caused by El Niño, strikes New England, southern Ontario, Quebec, and New Brunswick, resulting in widespread power failures, severe damage to forests, and numerous deaths.
 January 8 – Ramzi Yousef is sentenced to life in prison for planning the 1993 World Trade Center bombing.
 January 14 – Researchers in Dallas, Texas present findings about an enzyme that slows aging and cell death (apoptosis).
 January 15–18 – The Winter X Games take place in Crested Butte.
 January 17 – Paula Jones accuses U.S. President Bill Clinton of sexual harassment.
 January 23 – Mir Qazi is sentenced to death for a 1993 assault rifle attack outside CIA headquarters that killed two and wounded three.
 January 25 – Super Bowl XXXII: The Denver Broncos become the first AFC team in 14 years to win the Super Bowl, as they defeat the Green Bay Packers, 31–24.
 January 26 
Lewinsky scandal: On American television, President Bill Clinton denies he had "sexual relations" with former White House intern Monica Lewinsky.
Compaq buys Digital Equipment Corporation.
 January 27 – U.S. First Lady Hillary Clinton appears on The Today Show, calling the attacks against her husband part of a "vast right-wing conspiracy".
 January 28 – Ford Motor Company announces the buyout of Volvo Cars for $6.45 billion.
 January 29 – In Birmingham, Alabama, a bomb explodes at an abortion clinic, killing one and severely wounding another. Serial bomber Eric Rudolph is the prime suspect.

February
 February – Iraq disarmament crisis: The United States Senate passes Resolution 71, urging U.S. President Bill Clinton to "take all necessary and appropriate actions to respond to the threat posed by Iraq's refusal to end its weapons of mass destruction programs."
 February 3 
Cavalese cable car disaster: a United States Military pilot causes the deaths of 20 people near Trento, Italy, when his low-flying plane severs the cable of a cable-car.
Karla Faye Tucker is executed in Texas, becoming the first woman executed in the United States since 1984 and the first to be executed in Texas since the American Civil War.
 February 6
 Child rapist Mary Kay Letourneau is sent back to prison after violating a no-contact order and again raping her victim. Letourneau previously struck a plea deal to only serve six months for her crimes, but her breach of the contact order meant the full seven year five month sentence was restored.
 Washington National Airport is renamed Ronald Reagan Washington National Airport.
 February 7–22 – The United States compete at the Winter Olympics in Nagano, Japan and win 6 gold, 3 silver, and 4 bronze medals.
 February 7 – Roger Nicholas Angleton commits suicide in a prison cell in Houston, Texas and admits to murdering socialite Doris Angleton in his suicide note.
 February 10 – Voters in Maine repeal a gay rights law passed in 1997, becoming the first U.S. state to abandon such a law.
 February 12 – The presidential line-item veto is declared unconstitutional by a United States federal judge.
 February 14 – The Department of Justice announces that Eric Robert Rudolph is a suspect in an Alabama abortion clinic bombing.
 February 15 – Dale Earnhardt wins the Daytona 500 on his 20th attempt.
 February 18 – Two white separatists are arrested in Nevada, accused of plotting biological warfare on New York City subways.
 February 19 – Larry Wayne Harris of the Aryan Nations and William Leavitt are arrested in Henderson, New York, for possession of military grade anthrax.
 February 20 – Iraq disarmament crisis: Iraqi President Saddam Hussein negotiates a deal with U.N. Secretary General Kofi Annan, allowing weapons inspectors to return to Baghdad, preventing military action by the United States and Britain.
 February 23 – Florida El Niño Outbreak: Tornadoes in central Florida destroy or damage 2,600 structures and kill 42.

March

 March 4 – Gay rights: Oncale v. Sundowner Offshore Services: The Supreme Court of the United States rules that federal laws banning on-the-job sexual harassment also apply when both parties are the same sex.
 March 5
NASA announces that the Clementine probe orbiting the Moon has found enough water in polar craters to support a human colony and rocket fueling station.
NASA announces the choice of United States Air Force Lt. Col. Eileen Collins as commander of a future Space Shuttle Columbia mission to launch an X-ray telescope, making Collins the first woman to command a Space Shuttle mission.
 March 7 – The Imperial Wizard of the Ku Klux Klan is fined for burning a cross in his garden and infringing air regulations in California.
 March 10 – United States troops stationed in the Persian Gulf begin to receive the first anthrax vaccine.
 March 23 – The 70th Academy Awards, hosted by Billy Crystal, are held at Shrine Auditorium in Los Angeles. James Cameron's Titanic wins a record-tying 11 awards (tied with 1959's Ben-Hur) and leads with a record-tying 14 nominations (tied with 1950's All About Eve), including Best Picture and Best Director. The telecast is the most-watched Oscars broadcast in history, garnering over 57.2 million viewers.
 March 24 – Teenagers Mitchell Johnson and Andrew Golden open fire on classmates during a fire drill, killing five and injuring 10 at Westside Middle School in Jonesboro, Arkansas.
 March 27 – The Food and Drug Administration approves Viagra for use as a treatment for erectile dysfunction, the first pill to be approved for this condition in the United States.
 March 29 – A series of three tornadoes in southern Minnesota kill three people.
 March 30 – Serial killer Judy Buenoano is executed by electric chair in Florida, the first woman to be executed in the state since 1848.

April
 April – The unemployment rate drops to 4.3%, the lowest level since February 1970.
 April 6
 The Dow Jones Industrial Average closes above 9,000 for the first time, and ending a gain of 49.82 points, 9,033.23.
 Long running British children's television series Teletubbies begins its U.S. television debut on PTV.
 April 7 – Citicorp and Travelers Group announce plans to merge, creating the largest financial-services conglomerate in the world, Citigroup.
 April 8 – April 1998 Birmingham tornado: An F5 tornado strikes the western portion of the Birmingham, Alabama area, killing 32 people.
 April 16 – An F3 tornado passes through downtown Nashville, Tennessee, the first significant tornado in 11 years to directly hit a major city. An F5 tornado travels through rural portions south of Nashville (see 1998 Nashville tornado outbreak).
 April 18 – Toon Disney – devoted to carrying animated series and movies, 24 hours a day, is launched by The Walt Disney Company.
 April 22 – The Disney's Animal Kingdom theme park at Walt Disney World opens to the public for the first time.
 April 27 – The Aladdin Hotel & Casino in Las Vegas is imploded to make way for the brand new Aladdin Hotel & Casino.
 April 30 – Daniel V. Jones, a cancer and HIV-positive patient, commits suicide on a Los Angeles freeway after a police standoff. The event was broadcast live on television and caused controversy about airing police chases.

May

 May 13 – India carries out two more nuclear tests at Pokhran. The United States and Japan impose economic sanctions on India.
 May 18 – United States v. Microsoft: The United States Department of Justice and 20 U.S. states file an antitrust case against Microsoft.
 May 21 
At Thurston High School in Springfield, Oregon, Kipland Kinkel (who was suspended for bringing a gun to school) shoots a semi-automatic rifle into a room filled with students, killing two and wounding 25 others, after killing his parents at home.
In Miami, Florida, five abortion clinics are hit by a butyric acid attacker.
 May 22 – Lewinsky scandal: A federal judge rules that United States Secret Service agents can be compelled to testify before a grand jury concerning the scandal.
 May 27 – Oklahoma City bombing: Michael Fortier is sentenced to 12 years in prison and fined $75,000 for failing to warn authorities about the terrorist plot.
 May 28
Nuclear testing: In response to a series of Indian nuclear tests, Pakistan explodes five nuclear devices of its own in the Chaghai hills of Baluchistan, prompting the United States, Japan and other nations to impose economic sanctions.
 Saturday Night Live star Phil Hartman is murdered by his wife in their home, who then killed herself when police arrived.

June
 June 2 – California voters approve Proposition 227, abolishing the state's bilingual education program.
 June 4 – Terry Nichols is sentenced to life in prison for his role in the Oklahoma City bombing.
 June 5 – A strike begins at the General Motors Corporation parts factory in Flint, Michigan, quickly spreading to five other assembly plants and lasting seven weeks.
 June 7 – Three white supremacists murder James Byrd Jr. in Jasper, Texas.
 June 12
A jury in Hattiesburg, Mississippi, convicts 17-year-old Luke Woodham of killing two students and wounding seven others at Pearl High School.
Christina Marie Williams, 13, is kidnapped in Seaside, California while walking her dog.
 June 14 – The Chicago Bulls win their 6th NBA title in 8 years when they beat the Utah Jazz, 87–86 in Game 6. This is also Michael Jordan's last game as a Bull, clinching the game in the final seconds on a fadeaway jumper.
 June 16 – The Detroit Red Wings sweep the Washington Capitals in four games in the 1998 Stanley Cup Finals.
 June 19 – Walt Disney Pictures' 36th feature film, Mulan, is released to very positive reception and commercial success.
 June 25 
In the case of Clinton v. City of New York, 524 U.S. 417 (1998), the Supreme Court of the United States holds that the Line Item Veto Act is unconstitutional.
Microsoft releases Windows 98 (First Edition).
 June 28 – In professional wrestling, The Undertaker threw Mankind off Hell in a Cell and plummeted sixteen feet through an announcers table.

July
 July 5 – Japan launches a probe to Mars, joining the United States and Russia as an outer space-exploring nation.
 July 10 
The DNA-identified remains of United States Air Force 1st Lt. Michael Joseph Blassie arrive home to his family in St. Louis, Missouri, after being in the Tomb of the Unknowns since 1984.
Catholic priests' sex abuse scandal: The Diocese of Dallas agrees to pay $23.4 million to nine former altar boys who claimed they were sexually abused by former priest Rudolph Kos.
 July 24
1998 United States Capitol shooting incident: Russell Eugene Weston Jr. bursts into the United States Capitol and opens fire, killing two United States Capitol Police officers. He is later ruled incompetent to stand trial.
Saving Private Ryan premieres in movie theaters.
 July 25 – The United States Navy commissions the aircraft carrier  and puts her into service.
 July 28 – Monica Lewinsky scandal: Ex-White House intern Monica Lewinsky receives transactional immunity, in exchange for her grand jury testimony concerning her relationship with U.S. President Bill Clinton.

August

 August 7 – 1998 U.S. embassy bombings: The bombings of the United States embassies in Dar es Salaam, Tanzania, and Nairobi, Kenya kill 224 people and injure over 4,500; they are linked to terrorist Osama bin Laden, an exile of Saudi Arabia.
 August 14 – Gary C. Evans, infamous in New York's Capital Region for killing five people, escapes police custody and kills himself by jumping off a bridge.
 August 17 – Monica Lewinsky scandal: U.S. President Bill Clinton admits in taped testimony that he had an "improper physical relationship" with White House intern Monica Lewinsky. He also admits before the nation that night in a nationally televised address that he "misled people" about his sexual affair with Lewinsky.
 August 20 – 1998 U.S. embassy bombings: The United States military launches cruise missile attacks against alleged al-Qaeda camps in Afghanistan and a suspected chemical plant in Sudan in retaliation for the August 7 bombings of American embassies in Kenya and Tanzania. The al-Shifa pharmaceutical factory in Khartoum is destroyed in the attack.
 August 26 – Iraq disarmament crisis: Scott Ritter resigns from UNSCOM, sharply criticizing the Clinton administration and the U.N. Security Council for not being vigorous enough about insisting that Iraq's weapons of mass destruction be destroyed. Ritter tells reporters that "Iraq is not disarming," "Iraq retains the capability to launch a chemical strike."

September

 September 2 – A McDonnell Douglas MD-11 airliner (Swissair Flight 111) crashes near Peggys Cove, Nova Scotia, after taking off from New York City en route to Geneva; all 229 people on board are killed.
 September 4 – Google, Inc. is founded in Menlo Park, California, by Stanford University Ph.D. candidates Larry Page and Sergey Brin.
 September 8 – St. Louis Cardinals first baseman Mark McGwire breaks baseball's single-season home run record, formerly held since 1961 by Roger Maris. McGwire hits #62 at Busch Stadium in the 4th inning off of Chicago Cubs pitcher Steve Trachsel.
 September 9 – Serial killer Dana Sue Gray pleads guilty to two counts of murder and one count of attempted murder in California. She is also believed to have murdered a third victim.
 September 20 – Raymond James Stadium in Tampa, Florida opens.
 September 25–28 – Major creditors of Long-Term Capital Management, a Greenwich, Connecticut-based hedge fund, after days of tough bargaining and some informal mediation by Federal Reserve officials, agree on terms of a re-capitalization.
 September 29 – Iraq disarmament crisis: The U.S. Congress passes the Iraq Liberation Act, which states that the United States wants to remove Saddam Hussein from power and replace the government with a democratic institution.

October

 October 4 – Leafie Mason is murdered in her Hughes Springs, Texas house by Angel Maturino Resendiz. She is his second victim in his second incident.
 October 6 – College student Matthew Shepard is found tied to a fence near Laramie, Wyoming. He dies October 12, becoming a symbol of gay-bashing victims and sparking public reflection on homophobia in the U.S.
 October 7 – The United States Congress passes the Sonny Bono Copyright Term Extension Act, which gives copyright holders 20 more years of copyright privilege on work they control. This effectively freezes the public domain to works created before 1923 in the United States.
 October 12 – The Congress of the United States passes the Digital Millennium Copyright Act.
 October 14 – Eric Robert Rudolph is charged with six bombings (including the 1996 Olympic bombing) in Atlanta, Georgia.
 October 15 
American Airlines becomes the first airline to offer electronic ticketing in all 44 countries it serves.
The Bellagio Hotel & Casino in Las Vegas opens on the former grounds of the Dunes Hotel.
 October 17–18 – Severe flooding takes place in south central Texas.
 October 21 – The New York Yankees defeat the San Diego Padres to sweep them in the World Series. The Yankees finish with 114 regular-season wins and 11 postseason victories (125 total – the most by any team in 123 years of Major League baseball).
 October 29 
STS-95: The Space Shuttle Discovery blasts off with 77-year-old John Glenn on board, making him the oldest person to go into space. (He became the first American to orbit the Earth on February 20, 1962.)
In Freehold Borough, New Jersey, Melissa Drexler pleads guilty to aggravated manslaughter for killing her baby moments after delivering him in the bathroom at her senior prom, and is sentenced to 15 years imprisonment.

November
 November 3 – Jesse Ventura, former professional wrestler, is elected Governor of Minnesota.
 November 5 
Lewinsky scandal: As part of the impeachment inquiry, House Judiciary Committee chairman Henry Hyde sends a list of 81 questions to U.S. President Bill Clinton.
The journal Nature publishes a genetic study showing compelling evidence that Thomas Jefferson fathered his slave Sally Hemings' son Eston Hemings Jefferson.
 November 7 – John Glenn returns to Earth aboard the Space Shuttle Discovery.
 November 9 – In the largest civil settlement in United States history, a federal judge approves a US$1.03 billion settlement requiring dozens of brokerage houses (including Merrill Lynch, Goldman Sachs, and Salomon Smith Barney) to pay investors who claim they were cheated in a widespread price-fixing scheme on the NASDAQ.
 November 12 – Daimler-Benz completes a merger with Chrysler Corporation to form Daimler-Chrysler.
 November 13–14 – Iraq disarmament crisis: U.S. President Bill Clinton orders airstrikes on Iraq, then calls them off at the last minute when Iraq promises once again to "unconditionally" cooperate with UNSCOM.
 November 19 – Lewinsky scandal: The United States House of Representatives' Judiciary Committee begins impeachment hearings against U.S. President Bill Clinton.
 November 20
 A court in Taliban-controlled Afghanistan declares accused terrorist Osama bin Laden "a man without a sin" in regard to the 1998 U.S. embassy bombings in Kenya and Tanzania.
 November 25
 Pixar's second feature film, A Bug's Life, is released in theatres.
 November 24 – America Online announces it will acquire Netscape Communications in a stock-for-stock transaction worth US$4.2 billion.
 November 30 – Deutsche Bank announces a US$10 billion deal to buy Bankers Trust, thus creating the largest financial institution in the world.

December
 December – Grade school children in Aurora, Colorado, collect $35,000 to purchase and free enslaved children in Sudan.
 December 1 – Exxon announces a US$73.7 billion deal to buy Mobil, thus creating Exxon-Mobil, the second-largest company on the planet by revenue.
 December 5 – D.C. United defeats Vasco da Gama 2–1 on aggregate to win the Interamerican Cup (one of the greatest triumphs in the history of U.S. club soccer).
 December 16–19 – Iraq disarmament crisis: U.S. President Bill Clinton orders American and British airstrikes on Iraq. UNSCOM withdraws all weapons inspectors from Iraq.
 December 17 – Claudia Benton, of West University Place, Texas, is murdered in her house by Angel Maturino Resendiz (his third victim in his third incident).
 December 19 – Lewinsky scandal: President Bill Clinton is impeached by the United States House of Representatives. (He was later acquitted.)
 December 21 – Iraq disarmament crisis: UN Security Council members France, Germany and Russia call for sanctions to end against Iraq. The 3 Security Council members also call for UNSCOM to either be disbanded or for its role to be recast. The U.S. says it will veto any such proposal.
 December 26 – Iraq disarmament crisis: Iraq announces its intention to fire upon U.S. and British warplanes that patrol the northern and southern "no-fly zones".

Ongoing
 Iraqi no-fly zones (1991–2003)
 Dot-com bubble (c. 1995–c. 2000)

Date unknown
Great Blunders of World War II, documentary television series is released.
Guitars in the Classroom, a music education organization, is founded in San Diego, California.

Sports

 January 25 – Super Bowl XXXII: The Denver Broncos become the first AFC team in 14 years to win the Super Bowl, as they defeat the Green Bay Packers, 31–24.
 February 15 – Dale Earnhardt wins the Daytona 500 on his 20th attempt.
 June 14 – The Chicago Bulls win their 6th NBA title in 8 years when they beat the Utah Jazz, 87–86 in Game 6. This is also Michael Jordan's last game as a Bull, clinching the game in the final seconds on a fadeaway jumper.
 June 16 – The Detroit Red Wings sweep the Washington Capitals in four games in the 1998 Stanley Cup Finals.
 September 20 – Raymond James Stadium in Tampa, Florida opens.
 October 21 – The New York Yankees defeat the San Diego Padres to sweep them in the World Series. The Yankees finish with 114 regular-season wins and 11 postseason victories (125 total – the most by any team in 123 years of Major League baseball).
 November 3 – Jesse Ventura, former professional wrestler, is elected Governor of Minnesota.

Births

January

 January 1 – Samuel Kwong, fencer
 January 2 – Tfue, youtuber
 January 4 
Coco Jones, actress, singer, rapper, and dancer
Liza Soberano, Filipino-American model and actress
 January 6 – Norman Grimes, American sprinter
 January 9 – Kerris Dorsey, actress and singer
 January 10 – Michael Mmoh, tennis player
 January 12 – Nathan Gamble, actor
 January 13 – Kamron Doyle, bowler
 January 21 – Amelia Hundley, artistic gymnast
 January 22 – Silentó, rapper
 January 23
Rachel Crow, singer and actress
Cole Custer, stock car racing driver
XXXTentacion, rapper, singer and songwriter (died 2018)
 January 26 – Leeah D. Jackson, actress
 January 28 – Ariel Winter, actress
 January 31 – Bradie Tennell, figure skater

February

 February 1 – Stefan Kozlov, tennis player
 February 4 – Malik Monk, basketball player  
 February 6 – Adley Rutschman, baseball catcher 
 February 11 
 Khalid, singer
 Josh Jacobs, American football player
 Ryan Lindgren, ice hockey player
 February 15 – Zachary Gordon, actor
 February 17 – Devin White, American football player
 February 18 – Matthew Davidson, guitarist and singer
 February 20 – Corbin, singer
 February 26
 Yetur Gross-Matos, American football player
 Jeremy Chinn American football player

March

 March 2 – Tua Tagovailoa, American football player
 March 4 – Obi Toppin, basketball player 
 March 5 – Micah Fowler, actor
 March 9 – Najee Harris, American football player
 March 10 – Justin Herbert, American football player
 March 13 – Jack Harlow, rapper
 March 21 – Miles Bridges, basketball player
 March 24
 Ethel Cain, singer
 Damar Hamlin, football player
 March 25 – Ryan Simpkins, actress
 March 29 – Shealeigh, singer and songwriter
 March 31 – Jakob Chychrun, ice hockey player

April

 April 1 – Mitchell Robinson, basketball player
 April 3 – Paris Jackson, daughter of Michael Jackson
 April 4 – Malcolm Sutherland-Foggio, notable victim 
 April 6
 Peyton List, actress
 Spencer List, actor
 April 9 – Elle Fanning, actress
 April 14 – Brandon Ratcliff, actor
 April 21 – Jarrett Allen, basketball player
 April 24 – Ryan Newman, actress and singer

May

 May 2
 Ian Anderson, baseball pitcher
 Tremaine Edmunds, American football player
 May 4 
 Taylar Hender, actress
 Frank Jackson, basketball player
 May 6 
 Lil Poison, notable video gamer
 Kayden Troff, chessmaster
 May 7 - Jimmy Donaldson, YouTuber & philanthropist
 May 12 – Tornado Alicia Black, tennis player
 May 13 – Mickey Moniak, baseball outfielder
 May 17 – Terrance Ferguson, basketball player
 May 23 – Steve Lacy, musician, singer, songwriter, and record producer
 May 27 – Adam Riegler, actor

June

 June 8 – Arjun Ayyangar, pianist
 June 15 – Rachel Covey, actress
 June 16 – Lauren Taylor, actress and singer
 June 18 – Masha Slamovich, Russian-American pro wrestler
 June 19
 Joey Jett, skateboarder
 Atticus Shaffer, actor      
 June 24
 Coy Stewart, actor
 Tana Mongeau, youtuber
 June 29 – Michael Porter Jr., basketball player

July

 July 4 – Malia Obama, daughter of Barack Obama and Michelle Obama 
 July 7 – Dylan Sprayberry, actor
 July 8 – Jaden Smith, actor, rapper, songwriter, dancer, and the son of Will Smith and Jada Pinkett Smith
 July 9 – Robert Capron, actor
 July 10 – Haley Pullos, actress
 July 15
 JayDaYoungan, rapper (d. 2022)
 Tanner Maguire, actor
 July 18 – D. Savage, rapper
 July 19 – Karl Jacobs, youtuber
 July 22 – Madison Pettis, actress
 July 27 – Patrick Wood Crusius, mass murderer
 July 31
 Bretman Rock, vlogger
 Rico Rodriguez II, actor

August

 August 1 – Khamani Griffin, actor
 August 2 –  Joe Seo, actor
 August 3 – Cozi Zuehlsdorff, actress and singer
 August 6 – Forrest Goodluck, actor
 August 7 – Jalen Hurts, American football player
 August 8
 Ryan Garcia, boxer
 Shawn Mendes, songwriter, model, singer, and record producer
 August 11 – Nadia Azzi, pianist
 August 13 – Justin Schoenefeld, freestyle skier
 August 18 – Nick Fuentes, Alt-right YouTuber
 August 24 – Tziarra King, soccer player
 August 25 – China Anne McClain, actress and singer
 August 27 – Rod Wave, musician
 August 28 – Weston McKennie, soccer player
 August 29 – D'Angelo Wallace, youtube commentator

September

 September 2 – Austin Cindric, stock car driver
 September 7 – YK Osiris, rapper
 September 10 – Sheck Wes, rapper
 September 11 – Makenna Cowgill, actress
 September 14 – Wan Kuzain, Malaysian soccer player
 September 18 – Christian Pulisic, soccer player
 September 21
 Alex Hall, freestyle skier
 Brino quadruplets, actor
 September 28 – Jenna Rose, singer

October

 October 1 – Danika Yarosh, actress and dancer
 October 4 – Christopher Lillis, freestyle skier
 October 18 – Emily Robinson, actress
 October 22 – Roddy Ricch, rapper
 October 23 – Amandla Stenberg, actress
 October 26 – Samantha Isler, actress
 October 28 – Nolan Gould, actor
 October 29 – Prince Constantine Alexios of Greece and Denmark, son of Pavlos, Crown Prince of Greece

November

 November 4 – Darcy Rose Byrnes, actress and singer
 November 13 – Gattlin Griffith, actor
 November 14 – DeVonta Smith, American football player
 November 17
 Devin Haney, boxer
 Kara Hayward, actress
 November 18 – Ruby Jerins, actress
 November 20 – Savannah Robinson, singer
 November 23 – Just Sam, singer
 November 24
 Peyton Meyer, actor
 Brecken Palmer, actor
 Bridger Palmer, actor
 Jeremy Swayman, ice hockey player
 November 25 – Bradley Steven Perry, actor
 November 28 – Dylan Bluestone, actor

December

 December  – Chukwu octuplets
 December 2
 Amber Frank, actress
 Juice Wrld, rapper (d. 2019)
 December 8
 Tanner Buchanan, actor
 Owen Teague, actor
 December 14 – Maude Apatow, actress
 December 15 – Chandler Canterbury, actor
 December 16 – Kiara Muhammad, actress and singer
 December 22
 G Hannelius, actress
 Latto, rapper
 December 27 – Grayson Russell, actor
 December 28
 Paris Berelc, actress
 Jared Gilman, actor
 December 29 
 Seamus Davey-Fitzpatrick, actor
 Kaz Grala, stock car racing driver

Full date unknown
 Ada-Nicole Sanger, actress and fashion designer
 Jesse Koochin, notable euthanasia victim (d. 2004)

Deaths

January

 January 1 – Helen Wills, American tennis player (b. 1905)
 January 4 – Mae Questel, American actress (b. 1908)
 January 5 – Sonny Bono, American singer, actor, and politician (b. 1935)
 January 11 – Ellis Rabb, American director and actor (b. 1930)
 January 15 – Junior Wells, American harmonica player (b. 1934)
 January 16 – Emil Sitka, American actor (b. 1914)
 January 19 – Carl Perkins, American musician and guitarist (b. 1932)
 January 21 – Jack Lord, American actor (b. 1920)
 January 26 – Ethelreda Leopold, American actress (b. 1914)
 January 29 – Joseph Alioto, American lawyer and politician, 36th Mayor of San Francisco (b. 1916)

February

 February 2 – Raymond Cattell, British-American psychologist (b. 1905)
 February 3
 Fat Pat, American rapper (b. 1970)
 Karla Faye Tucker, convicted murderer (b. 1959)
 February 6 – Carl Wilson, American musician (b. 1946)
 February 7
 Lawrence Sanders, American author (b. 1920)
 Roger Nicholas Angleton, American murderer (b. 1942)
 February 10 – Buddy, notable canine (b. 1988)
 February 11 – Jonathan Hole, American actor (b. 1904)
 February 17 – Bob Merrill, American composer and screenwriter (b. 1921)
 February 18 
 Harry Caray, American television and radio broadcaster (b. 1914)
 Scott O'Hara, American pornographic performer, author, poet, editor and publisher (b. 1961)
 February 19 – Grandpa Jones, American musician (b. 1913)
 February 22
 Red Reeder, U.S. Army officer and author (b. 1902)
 Abraham Alexander Ribicoff, American politician (b. 1910)
 February 23 – Philip Abbott, American actor (b. 1924)
 February 24 – Henny Youngman, British-born American comedian (b. 1906)
 February 26 – Theodore Schultz, American economist (b. 1902)
 February 27
 George H. Hitchings, American scientist (b. 1905)
 J. T. Walsh, American actor (b. 1943)

March

 March 2 – Darcy O'Brien, American author (b. 1939)
 March 3 – Fred W. Friendly, American television journalist and executive (b. 1915)
 March 7 – Bernarr Rainbow, historian of music education, organist, and choir master, (b. 1914)
 March 8 – Ray Nitschke, American football player (b. 1936)
 March 10 – Lloyd Bridges, American actor (b. 1913)
 March 12 – Risen Star, American racehorse (b. 1985)
 March 15 – Benjamin Spock, American rower, pediatrician, and author (b. 1903)
 March 20 – George Howard, American jazz saxophone musician (b. 1956)
 March 31 – Bella Abzug, American lawyer, feminist activist, and politician (b. 1920)

April

 April 1
 Gene Evans, American actor (b. 1920)
 Rozz Williams, American singer (b. 1963)
 April 3 – Charles Lang, American cinematographer (b. 1901)
 April 6
 Wendy O. Williams, American singer (b. 1949)
 Tammy Wynette, American singer (b. 1942)
 April 11
 Doris Tetzlaff, American female professional baseball player (b. 1921)
 Rodney Harvey, American actor and model (b. 1967)
 April 15 – Rose Maddox, American singer (b. 1925)
 April 17 – Linda McCartney, American photographer and musician (b. 1941)
 April 21
 Peter Lind Hayes, American entertainer (b. 1915)
 Irene Vernon, American actress (b. 1922)
 April 23 – James Earl Ray, assassin of Martin Luther King Jr. (b. 1928)
 April 25 – Wright Morris, American photographer and writer (b. 1910)
 April 27 – Carlos Castaneda, American anthropologist and author (b. 1925)

May

 May 1 – Eldridge Cleaver, American political activist and writer (b. 1935)
 May 2
 Maidie Norman, American actress (b. 1912)
 Gene Raymond, American actor (b. 1908)
 May 7 – Eddie Rabbitt, American musician (b. 1941)
 May 9
 Alice Faye, American entertainer (b. 1915)
 Rommie Loudd, American football player and coach (b. 1933)
 May 14
 Marjory Stoneman Douglas, American conservationist and writer (b. 1890)
 Frank Sinatra, singer and actor (b. 1915)
 May 15 – Earl Manigault, American street basketball player (b. 1944)
 May 21 – Douglas Fowley, American actor (b. 1911)
 May 22 – John Derek, American actor and film director (b. 1926)
 May 28 – Phil Hartman, Canadian-born American actor, comedian, and murder victim (b. 1948)
 May 29
 Orlando Anderson, American criminal, prime suspect in the Murder of Tupac Shakur (b. 1974)
 Barry Goldwater, American politician (b. 1909)

June

 June 2
 Junkyard Dog, American pro wrestler (b. 1952)
 Dorothy Stickney, American actress (b. 1896)
 June 5 
 Jeanette Nolan, American actress (b. 1911)
 Sam Yorty, American politician, Los Angeles' 37th mayor (1961–1973) (b. 1909). 
 June 9 – Lois Mailou Jones, African-American artist (b. 1905)
 June 12 – Theresa Merritt, American actress (b. 1924)
 June 23 – Maureen O'Sullivan, Irish-American actress (b. 1911 in Ireland)
 June 28 – Marion Eugene Carl, American fighter pilot (b. 1915)

July

 July 2 – Kay Thompson, American author and actress (b. 1909)
 July 3 – Danielle Bunten Berry, American software developer (b. 1949)
 July 4 – Gregg Burge, American tap dancer and choreographer (b. 1957)
 July 5 – Sid Luckman, American football player (b. 1916)
 July 6 – Roy Rogers, American singer and actor (b. 1911)
 July 17 – Joseph Maher, Irish-born American actor (b. 1933)
 July 19 – Elmer Valo, Slovak baseball player (b. 1921)
 July 21
 Alan Shepard, American astronaut (b. 1923)
 Robert Young, American actor (b. 1907)
 July 22 – Don Dunphy, American television and radio sports announcer (b. 1908)
 July 27 – Binnie Barnes, British-born American actress (b. 1903)
 July 28 – Harvie Branscomb, American university president (b. 1894)
 July 29 – Jerome Robbins, American choreographer and director (b. 1918)
 July 30 – Buffalo Bob Smith, American children's television host (b. 1917)

August 

 August 2 – Shari Lewis, American ventriloquist (b. 1933)
 August 6 – André Weil, French mathematician (b. 1906)
 August 9 – Frankie Ruiz, American salsa singer and songwriter (b. 1958)
 August 22 – Jack Briggs, American actor (b. 1920)
 August 24 
 Jerry Clower, American country comedian (b. 1926)
 E. G. Marshall, American actor (b. 1914)
 August 25 – Lewis F. Powell Jr., American Supreme Court Justice (b. 1907)
 August 26
 Wade Dominguez, American actor, model, singer, and dancer (b. 1966)
 Frederick Reines, American physicist (b. 1918)
 August 28 – George Büchi, American chemist (b. 1921)

September 

 September 1 – Cary Middlecoff, American golfer (b. 1921)
 September 2
 Allen Drury, American writer (b. 1918)
 Walter L. Morgan, American banker (b. 1898)
 September 5 – Leo Penn, American actor and director (b. 1921)
 September 8 – Leonid Kinskey, Russian-born actor (b. 1903)
 September 11 – Dane Clark, American actor (b. 1912)
 September 13 – George Wallace, American politician (b. 1919)
 September 14 – Johnny Adams, American singer (b. 1932)
 September 15 – Fred Alderman, American sprint runner (b. 1905)
 September 20 – Muriel Humphrey Brown, American politician (b. 1912)
 September 21 – Florence Griffith Joyner, American runner (b. 1959)
 September 23 – Mary Frann, American actress (b. 1942)
 September 26 – Betty Carter, American jazz singer (b. 1929)
 September 27 – Doak Walker, American football player (b. 1927)
 September 29 – Herbert V. Prochnow, U.S. banker and author (b. 1897)
 September 30
 Dan Quisenberry, American baseball player (b. 1953)
 Robert Lewis Taylor, American author (b. 1912)

October

 October 2 – Gene Autry, American actor, singer, and sports team owner (b. 1907)
 October 3 – Roddy McDowall, British-born American actor (b. 1928)
 October 6
 Mark Belanger, American baseball player (b. 1944)
 Ambrose Burke, Roman Catholic priest and educator (b. 1895)
 October 10 – Marvin Gay Sr., American minister (b. 1914)
 October 11 – Richard Denning, American actor (b. 1914)
 October 12 – Matthew Shepard, American murder victim (b. 1976)
 October 14 – Frankie Yankovic, American musician (b. 1916)
 October 16 – Jon Postel, American Internet pioneer (b. 1943)
 October 24 – Mary Calderone, American physician, public health advocate (b. 1904)
 October 28 – James Goldman, American writer (b. 1927)

November

 November 3
 Bob Kane, American comic book creator (b. 1915)
 Martha O'Driscoll, American film actress (b. 1922)
 November 10 – Hal Newhouser, American baseball player (b. 1921)
 November 15
 Stokely Carmichael, Trinidadian-American civil rights activist (b. 1941)
 Elisabeth Owens, legal scholar (b. 1919)
 November 17
 Kenneth McDuff, American serial killer (b. 1946)
 Esther Rolle, American actress (b. 1920)
 November 19 – Alan J. Pakula, American film director (b. 1928)
 November 22 – Stu Ungar, American professional poker player (b. 1953)
 November 23 – Don Ray, American basketball player (b. 1921)
 November 25 – Flip Wilson, American actor and comedian (b. 1933)
 November 29 – Frank Latimore, American actor (b. 1925)
 November 30 – Margaret Walker, American poet (b. 1915)

December

 December 1 – Freddie Young, American cinematographer (b. 1902)
 December 5 – Hazel Bishop, American chemist and inventor (b. 1906)
 December 7 – Martin Rodbell, American scientist (b. 1925)
 December 9 – Archie Moore, American professional boxer (b. 1916)
 December 11 – Lynn Strait, American musician (b. 1968)
 December 12 
 Lawton Chiles, American politician (b. 1930)
 Mo Udall, American politician (b. 1922)
 December 14
 Norman Fell, American actor (b. 1924)
 Annette Strauss, American philanthropist and politician (b. 1924)
 December 15 – Brady Boone, American professional wrestler (b. 1958)
 December 16 – William Gaddis, American writer (b. 1922)
 December 17 – Claudia Benton, Peruvian-born child psychologist (b. 1959)
 December 19 – Gordon Gunter, American marine biologist and fisheries scientist (b. 1909)
 December 20 – Irene Hervey, American actress (b. 1909)
 December 23 – David Manners, Canadian-American actor (b. 1900)
 December 25 – Richard Paul, American actor (b. 1940)
 December 26
 Hurd Hatfield, American actor (b. 1917)
 Robert Rosen, American biologist (b. 1934)
 William Frankfather, American actor (b. 1944)

See also 
 1998 in American soccer
 1998 in American television
 List of American films of 1998
 Timeline of United States history (1990–2009)

References

External links
 

 
1990s in the United States
United States
United States
Years of the 20th century in the United States